This article lists athletes from the Netherlands who competed at the 1992 Winter Olympics in Albertville, France.

Medalists

Competitors
The following is the list of number of competitors in the Games.

Short track speed skating

Men

Women

Speed skating

Men

Women

References

External links
 Official Olympic Reports
 International Olympic Committee results database
 Olympic Winter Games 1992, full results by sports-reference.com

Nations at the 1992 Winter Olympics
1992
W